Fitzherbert is a suburb of Palmerston North, Manawatū-Whanganui, New Zealand.

The Massey University Manawatu Campus is west and northwest of Fitzherbert.

The Food HQ was established north of the Massey University campus in 1971, and includes Plant & Food Research, Fonterra and Massey University research facilities.

Demographics

It  had a population of 3,318 at the 2018 New Zealand census, an increase of 411 people (14.1%) since the 2013 census, and an increase of 618 people (22.9%) since the 2006 census. There were 1,098 households. There were 1,572 males and 1,743 females, giving a sex ratio of 0.9 males per female. The median age was 41.5 years (compared with 37.4 years nationally), with 519 people (15.6%) aged under 15 years, 792 (23.9%) aged 15 to 29, 1,410 (42.5%) aged 30 to 64, and 591 (17.8%) aged 65 or older.

Ethnicities were 73.8% European/Pākehā, 5.9% Māori, 1.4% Pacific peoples, 22.1% Asian, and 3.4% other ethnicities (totals add to more than 100% since people could identify with multiple ethnicities).

The proportion of people born overseas was 35.2%, compared with 27.1% nationally.

Although some people objected to giving their religion, 44.7% had no religion, 38.3% were Christian, 2.4% were Hindu, 3.6% were Muslim, 2.1% were Buddhist and 2.4% had other religions.

Of those at least 15 years old, 1,068 (38.2%) people had a bachelor or higher degree, and 246 (8.8%) people had no formal qualifications. The median income was $32,900, compared with $31,800 nationally. The employment status of those at least 15 was that 1,242 (44.4%) people were employed full-time, 399 (14.3%) were part-time, and 93 (3.3%) were unemployed.

References

Suburbs of Palmerston North
Populated places on the Manawatū River